The 2019 Ghana Football Association Normalization Committee Special Competition was a special competition organized by the Ghana Football Association (GFA) Normalization Committee in 2019 in place of the Ghana Premier League, the top association football league in Ghana.

Due to the dissolution of the GFA in June 2018, the 2018 league season was abandoned, and a special competition was organized by the GFA Normalization Committee in 2019 to revive domestic football until the re-organization of the GFA. The competition started on 30 March 2019.

Tier 1

Group stage
The teams are divided into two groups: Group A for teams in the North and Group B for teams in the South.

Group A

Group B

Championship playoff

Semifinals

Final

Asante Kotoko qualified for 2019–20 CAF Champions League.

Tier 2

Final

Ashanti Gold qualified for 2019–20 CAF Confederation Cup.

Top scorers

References

Ghana Premier League seasons
Ghana
1